Conothele is a genus of mygalomorph spiders in the family Halonoproctidae, first described by Tamerlan Thorell in 1878. Originally placed with the Ctenizidae, it was moved to the Halonoproctidae in 2018.

Species
 it contains 35 species:
Conothele arboricola Pocock, 1899 – Papua New Guinea (New Britain), Australia (Queensland)
Conothele baisha H. Liu, Xu, Zhang, F. Liu & Li, 2019 – China (Hainan)
Conothele baiyunensis X. Xu, C. Xu & Liu, 2017 – China
Conothele baoting H. Liu, Xu, Zhang, F. Liu & Li, 2019 – China (Hainan)
Conothele birmanica Thorell, 1887 – Myanmar
Conothele cambridgei Thorell, 1890 – Indonesia (Sumatra)
Conothele cangshan Yang & Xu, 2018 – China
Conothele chinnarensis Sunil Jose, 2021 – India
Conothele daxinensis X. Xu, C. Xu & Liu, 2017 – China
Conothele deqin Yang & Xu, 2018 – China
Conothele doleschalli Thorell, 1881 – Australia (Queensland)
Conothele ferox Strand, 1913 – New Guinea
Conothele fragaria (Dönitz, 1887) – Japan
Conothele giganticus Siliwal & Raven, 2015 – India
Conothele gressitti (Roewer, 1963) – Micronesia
Conothele hebredisiana Berland, 1938 – Vanuatu
Conothele isan Decae, Schwendinger & Hongpadharakiree, 2021 – Thailand
Conothele jinggangshan H. Liu, Xu, Zhang, F. Liu & Li, 2019 – China
Conothele khunthokhanbi Kananbala, Bhubaneshwari & Siliwal, 2015 – India
Conothele lampra (Chamberlin, 1917) – USA?
Conothele limatior Kulczyński, 1908 – New Guinea
Conothele linzhi H. Liu, Xu, Zhang, F. Liu & Li, 2019 – China
Conothele malayana (Doleschall, 1859) (type) – Indonesia (Moluccas), New Guinea, Australia
Conothele martensi Decae, Schwendinger & Hongpadharakiree, 2021 – Thailand
Conothele medoga Zhang & Yu, 2021 – China
Conothele nigriceps Pocock, 1898 – Solomon Is.
Conothele ogalei Sanap, Pawar, Joglekar & Khandekar, 2022 – India
Conothele sidiechongensis X. Xu, C. Xu & Liu, 2017 – China, Laos
Conothele spinosa Hogg, 1914 – New Guinea
Conothele taiwanensis (Tso, Haupt & Zhu, 2003) – Taiwan
Conothele trachypus Kulczyński, 1908 – Papua New Guinea (New Britain)
Conothele truncicola Saaristo, 2002 – Seychelles
Conothele vali Siliwal, Nair, Molur & Raven, 2009 – India
Conothele varvarti Siliwal, Nair, Molur & Raven, 2009 – India
Conothele yundingensis X. Xu, C. Xu & Liu, 2017 – China

References

External links

Halonoproctidae
Mygalomorphae genera
Taxa named by Tamerlan Thorell